Protanystropheus is an extinct genus of archosauromorph from the Middle Triassic (Anisian stage) of Poland, Germany, Austria and the Netherlands. It was named by Sennikov in 2011 and the type species is Protanystropheus antiquus, first described in 1908 by German paleontologist Friedrich von Huene under the name Tanystropheus antiquus (some authors still prefer to include this species within Tanystropheus). Sennikov (2011) referred to Protanystropheus several vertebrae, including those belonging to "Thecodontosaurus" primus, but such a referral has later been questioned, because these specimens may represent other basal archosauromorphs.

References

Tanystropheids
Prehistoric reptile genera
Anisian genera
Middle Triassic reptiles of Europe
Triassic Austria
Fossils of Austria
Triassic Germany
Fossils of Germany
Fossils of the Netherlands
Fossils of Poland
Fossil taxa described in 2011